Eupithecia finitima is a moth in the family Geometridae. It is found in China (Shensi).

References

Moths described in 1979
finitima
Moths of Asia